Konstantinos Livanos (born 23 October 2000) is a Greek track cyclist.

References

2000 births
Living people
Greek track cyclists
Greek male cyclists
Sportspeople from Chania
21st-century Greek people